Tivi Ilisituk (born January 2, 1933) is an Inuk hunter and carver from Salluit, Quebec.

Early life 
Ilisituk was born in 1933 and began carving in 1954, using light gray stone from the Kovik River. He also created prints.

Career 
Ilisituk's work primarily features hunting themes. in 1967, one of his sculptures was featured in Eskimo Sculpture, a highly acclaimed exhibition that the Winnipeg Art Gallery organized and presented at the Manitoba Legislative Building.

Ilisituk's work is held in several museums, including the British Museum, the National Gallery of Canada, the University of Toronto Art Collection, and the University of Michigan Museum of Art.

References 

Artists from Quebec
Inuit sculptors
1933 births
20th-century Canadian sculptors
People from Nunavik
Inuit from Quebec
Canadian male sculptors
Living people
20th-century Canadian male artists